The third event of the 2022 Curling Stadium Alberta Curling Series was held from October 21 to 23 at the Leduc Recreation Centre in Leduc, Alberta. It was the third of five men's and women's events held as part of the Alberta Curling Series for the 2022–23 curling season. The total purse for the event was $5,000 on the men's side and $8,900 on the women's side.

The event was sponsored by Curling Stadium, a streaming service provided by CurlingZone. All of the games were streamed on CurlingZone and the Alberta Curling Series' YouTube page.

Men

Teams
The teams are listed as follows:

Round-robin standings
Final round-robin standings

Round-robin results 
All draw times are listed in Mountain Time (UTC−06:00).

Draw 2
Friday, October 21, 7:00 pm

Draw 4
Saturday, October 22, 9:00 am

Draw 7
Saturday, October 22, 7:00 pm

Tiebreaker
Sunday, October 23, 9:00 am

Playoffs

Source:

Semifinals
Sunday, October 23, 12:00 pm

Final
Sunday, October 23, 3:00 pm

Women

Teams
The teams are listed as follows:

Round-robin standings
Final round-robin standings

Round-robin results 
All draw times are listed in Mountain Time (UTC−06:00).

Draw 1
Friday, October 21, 4:00 pm

Draw 3
Friday, October 21, 9:30 pm

Draw 5
Saturday, October 22, 12:00 pm

Draw 6
Saturday, October 22, 4:00 pm

Draw 8
Saturday, October 22, 9:30 pm

Playoffs

Source:

Quarterfinals
Sunday, October 23, 9:00 am

Semifinals
Sunday, October 23, 12:00 pm

Final
Sunday, October 23, 3:00 pm

References

External links
Official Website
Men's Event
Women's Event

2022 in Canadian curling
2022 in curling
Curling in Alberta
October 2022 sports events in Canada
2022 in Alberta
Leduc, Alberta